Matthew Preston White "Matt" Wangler (August 15, 1957 – February 11, 2013) was an American basketball player for the University of Pennsylvania, and was later drafted by the Portland Trail Blazers. He helped lead Penn into the final four of the 1979 NCAA Men's Division I Basketball Tournament. He played professionally in the Liga ACB for Valladolid Miñón/Grupo Libro Valladolid, RC Náutico Tenerife, Cacaolat Granollers, Puleva Baloncesto Granada and Valvi Girona.

Death

White was killed by his wife Maria Reyes Garcia-Pellon, a native of Spain, after she allegedly observed him watching child pornography. Police found no pornography on any of the computers in their home. She stabbed him several times in the throat.  In court proceedings, a plea of temporary insanity was entered. His wife was suffering from schizo-affective disorder at the time and had been off her medication. Matthew had attempted to have her admitted to a psychiatric care center the day before his death, but was only able to make an appointment for the following day. In December 2014 a court dropped the murder charges during a bench trial, and she was subsequently found guilty but mentally ill of voluntary manslaughter. She was paroled pending availability of a bed at Norristown State Hospital

References

1957 births
2013 deaths
American expatriate basketball people in Spain
Basketball players from Pennsylvania
CB Valladolid players
Centers (basketball)
Gijón Baloncesto players
Liga ACB players
Penn Quakers men's basketball players
Portland Trail Blazers draft picks
Place of birth missing
American men's basketball players